This is a list of Cultural Properties of the Philippines in Pinamalayan, Oriental Mindoro.

|}

References

Pinamalayan
Buildings and structures in Oriental Mindoro